Ptychomitrium is a widespread genus of mosses found in many parts of the world.

Species

References

Grimmiales
Moss genera